Freedom is a song by Australian rock band, Sherbet. It was released in March 1975 as the first and only single from the band's live album, In Concert, recorded live on Sherbet's Slipstream Tour. The song was written by Garth Porter and Clive Shakespeare.

Track listing

Personnel 
 Daryl Braithwaite - Lead vocals
 Tony Mitchell - Bass, vocals
 Garth Porter - Keyboards, vocals
 Alan Sandow - Drums 
 Clive Shakespeare - Guitar, vocals

Charts

References 

Sherbet (band) songs
1975 singles
1974 songs
Festival Records singles
Infinity Records singles
Songs written by Garth Porter
Songs written by Clive Shakespeare
Song recordings produced by Richard Batchens